Doğan Seyfi Atlı Stadium is a soccer-specific stadium in Denizli, Turkey. It is currently used mostly for football matches and is the home ground of Denizli Belediyespor. The stadium holds 2,000 people and was built in 2003.

Football venues in Turkey
Sport in Denizli
Sports venues completed in 2003
Buildings and structures in Denizli Province